Gonzalo Cacicedo Verdú (born 21 October 1988) is a Spanish professional footballer who plays for Elche CF as a centre-back.

Club career
Born in Cartagena, Region of Murcia, Verdú spent the vast majority of his career in the lower leagues of his country. In 2010–11 he made his professional debut with Albacete Balompié, his input consisting of six games in a relegation-ending season from Segunda División; his first appearance in the competition was on 23 April 2011, playing 60 minutes – as a substitute – in a 4–2 away loss against Xerez CD.

Verdú continued his career in the Segunda División B the following years, representing CA Osasuna B, Orihuela CF, Córdoba CF B, CD Guadalajara, FC Cartagena and Elche CF. He won two promotions in three years with the last of those clubs, reaching La Liga at the end of the 2019–20 campaign with his as one of the captains.

Verdú made his debut in the Spanish top flight on 26 September 2020, starting and being booked in the 0–3 home defeat to Real Sociedad; he was aged 31 years and 11 months. In August 2021, he signed a new contract until 2023.

Career statistics

References

External links

1988 births
Living people
Sportspeople from Cartagena, Spain
Spanish footballers
Footballers from the Region of Murcia
Association football defenders
La Liga players
Segunda División players
Segunda División B players
Tercera División players
Cartagena FC players
Pinatar CF players
Novelda CF players
Atlético Albacete players
Albacete Balompié players
CA Osasuna B players
Orihuela CF players
Córdoba CF B players
CD Guadalajara (Spain) footballers
FC Cartagena footballers
Elche CF players